Dmitriy Manuilsky, or Dmytro Zakharovych Manuilsky (Russian: Дми́трий Заха́рович Мануи́льский; Ukrainian: Дмитро Захарович Мануїльський; October 1883 in Sviatets near Kremenets – 22 February 1959 in Kiev) was an important Bolshevik revolutionary, Soviet politician and academic who was Secretary of the Executive Committee of Comintern, the Communist International, from December 1926 to its dissolution in May 1943.

Life

Background

Manuilsky was born to a peasant family of an Orthodox priest in Kremenets. After secondary school, he enrolled at the University of St. Petersburg in 1903, and joined the Bolshevik faction of the Russian Social Democratic Labour Party in 1904. During the 1905 revolution he was assigned by the Bolsheviks to the naval base in Kronstadt where he took part in the naval revolt in July. Arrested, he was held in Kronstadt prison in 1905-06, then exiled, but escaped, arriving in Kiev and then, in 1907, to Paris. There he aligned with the ultra-left group led by Alexander Bogdanov, who challenged Lenin for the leadership of the Bolsheviks, and worked on the newspaper Vpered (Forward). After the outbreak of war in 1914, he worked on the newspaper Nashe Slovo and acted as the main contact between the Bolsheviks and the smaller group associated with Leon Trotsky. 
After his return to Russia in May 1917, he joined Trotsky's group, the Mezhraiontsy, who amalgamated with the Bolsheviks in August 1917.

In the Soviet Union 
During the Civil War, Manuilsky worked in the People's Commissariat for Food, before being sent to Ukraine, where Lenin assigned him the task of organising the peasant population around Kharkiv to defeat the White army of General Denikin. In January 1919, he and Inessa Armand were sent to Paris, in the hope they could stoke a revolution in France, but he was arrested and deported. He was People's Commissar for Food in the Ukrainian Soviet republic in 1920-21, then switched to journalism, and from 1922 was working for the Comintern. 
He was a member of the Central Committee of the Communist Party of the Soviet Union, 1923–52, as well as a member of the elite inner circle known as the "malaia comisiia", a five-member group that ruled the eleven-member Political Secretariat. In 1926, he supplanted Nikolai Bukharin as leader of the Soviet Union delegation on Comintern's executive, and the lead representative at congresses of the French, German, and Czechoslovak communist parties.

From 1935 until the dissolution of Comintern in 1943, he acted as deputy to its General Secretary, Georgi Dimitrov. In 1944-52, he held the largely meaningless post of Foreign Minister of Ukraine. In 1952-53, he was Ukrainian ambassador to the United Nations.

Later life and career 
During the purges of 1936-40, almost every Old Bolshevik with a past link with Trotsky was killed or imprisoned, except Manuilsky, whom Stalin despised but by whom he did not feel in any way threatened. In 1939, he told Dimitrov: "Manuilsky is a toady! He was a Trotskyite! We criticised him for keeping quiet and not speaking out when the purges of Trotskyite bandits were going on, and now he has started toadying!" The Montenegrin communist Milovan Djilas, who met Manuilsky in 1944, admired his learning and writing talent, but remembered him as "a slight and already hunched veteran, dark-haired, with a clipped moustache [who] spoke with a lisp, almost gently and – what astonished me at the time – without much energy." Seeing him again five years later, Djilas thought him an "almost senile, little old man who was rapidly disappearing as he slid down the steep ladder of the Soviet hierarchy."

See also
Mezhraiontsy
Communist Party of Poland
List of delegates of the 2nd Comintern congress
List of national leaders of Ukraine
Ukrainian SSR
Lucrețiu Pătrășcanu
Christian Rakovsky
Permanent Representative of Ukraine to the United Nations

References

External links

 
Walter Lacquer, Russia and Germany; A Century of Conflict, London, Weidenfeld and Nicolson 1965.

1883 births
1959 deaths
Burials at Baikove Cemetery
People from Khmelnytskyi Oblast
People from Volhynian Governorate
Ukrainian people in the Russian Empire
Mezhraiontsy
Old Bolsheviks
Central Committee of the Communist Party of the Soviet Union members
First Secretaries of the Communist Party of Ukraine (Soviet Union)
First convocation members of the Soviet of the Union
Second convocation members of the Soviet of the Union
Third convocation members of the Soviet of the Union
Communist Party of Ukraine (Soviet Union) politicians
Permanent Representatives of Ukraine to the United Nations
Recipients of the Order of Lenin
Soviet foreign ministers of Ukraine
Land cultivation ministers of Ukraine
Executive Committee of the Communist International
Russian Social Democratic Labour Party members
Ukrainian revolutionaries